Angelika Liebsch (born 19 April 1950) is a German athlete. She competed in the women's long jump at the 1972 Summer Olympics.

References

1950 births
Living people
Athletes (track and field) at the 1972 Summer Olympics
German female long jumpers
Olympic athletes of East Germany
Place of birth missing (living people)